The "Mudmen" of Papua New Guinea's Asaro tribe, also known as the Holosa, are those who wear a traditional costume centered around masks made of mud. They live nearby the village of Goroka in the Eastern Highlands Province of Papua New Guinea.

Creation legend 
There are several oral history versions regarding the creation of the Asaro Mudmen, with anthropologist Todd Otto noting, "there are as many versions of [the creation legend] as there are sources."

In one recitation, they were defeated by an enemy tribe and forced to flee into the Asaro River where they met a man who gave them eyes to kill. They waited until dusk before attempting to escape the one who was given the eyes was captured. The enemy saw him rise from the muddy banks covered in mud and thought he was spirit. Most tribes in Papua New Guinea are very afraid of spirits. Therefore, the enemy fled in fear, and the Asaro escaped.  They then went into the village to see what had happened, not knowing the enemy tribesmen were still there. The enemy were so terrified they ran back to their village and held a special ceremony to ward off the spirits.  The mudmen could not cover their faces because legends say that the people of Papua New Guinea thought that the mud from the Asaro river was poisonous.  So instead of covering their faces with this alleged poison, they made masks from pebbles that they heated and water from the waterfall.Another version claims that the tradition began with a wedding guest who was unable to find a traditional wedding costume.

The masks have unusual designs, such as long or very short ears either going down to the chin or sticking up at the top, long joined eyebrows attached to the top of the ears, horns and sideways mouths.

According to research in September 1996 by Danish anthropologist Ton Otto from Aarhus University, the regarding the Mudmen, the tradition is undeniably an Asaro invention. The current elaborate form of the Mudmen tradition, which originated from a 1957 cultural fair, is likely to have been influenced by outside elements such as tour operators, writers, and government administrators.

See also 
Paantu, a tradition of Miyako Island, Okinawa Prefecture.
Lower Asaro Rural LLG
Upper Asaro Rural LLG
Asaro River

References 
Otto and Verloop, "The Asaro Mudmen: Local Property, Public Culture?" 1996

External links 
 Asaro Mudmen Photographs

Masks in Papua New Guinea
Eastern Highlands Province